Cordera is both a given name and a surname. Notable people with the name include:

 Cordera Eason (born 1987), American football player, trainer, and coach
 Cordera Jenkins (born 1988) American hurdler
 Gustavo Cordera (born 1961), Argentine musician